The 1180s was a decade of the Julian Calendar which began on January 1, 1180, and ended on December 31, 1189.

Significant people

References